United States Army Field Manuals are published by the United States Army's Army Publishing Directorate. They contain detailed information and how-tos for procedures important to soldiers serving in the field.

As of July 2007, some 542 field manuals were in use.  Starting in 2010, the U.S. Army began review and revision of all of its doctrinal publications, under the initiative "Doctrine 2015". Since then, the most important doctrine have been published in Army Doctrine Publications (ADP) and Army Doctrine Reference Publications (ADRP), replacing the former key Field Manuals. Army Techniques Publications (ATP), Army Training Circulars (TC), and Army Technical Manuals (TM) round out the new suite of doctrinal publications. Not all FMs are being rescinded; 50 select Field Manuals will continue to be published, periodically reviewed and revised. They are usually available to the public at low cost or free electronically. Many websites have begun collecting PDF versions of Army Field Manuals, Technical Manuals, and Weapon Manuals.

History

According to The New York Times, the Army has started to "wikify" certain field manuals, allowing any authorized user to update the manuals. This process, specifically using the MediaWiki arm of the military's professional networking application, milSuite, was recognized by the White House as an Open Government Initiative in 2010.

List of selected field manuals 
FM 6-22 Leader Development "The tenets of Army leader development provide the essential principles that have made the Army successful at developing its leaders."
FM 1, The Army – "establishes the fundamental principles for employing landpower." Together, it and FM 3–0 are considered by the U.S. Army to be the "two capstone doctrinal manuals."
FM 3–0, Operations – The operations guide "lays out the fundamentals of war fighting for future and current generations of recruits."
FM 3-05.70 U.S. Army Survival Manual –Used to train survival techniques (formerly the FM 21-76).
 FM 3–0.5.130, Army Special Operations Forces Unconventional Warfare. Establishes keystone doctrine for Army special operations forces (ARSOF) operations in unconventional warfare.
FM 5–31, Boobytraps – Describes how regular demolition charges and materials can be used for victim-initiated explosive devices. This manual is no longer active, but is still frequently referenced.
FM 3–21.8, The Infantry Rifle Platoon and Squad
FM 3–24, Insurgencies and Countering Insurgencies;– Published May 2014.
 FM 7-0: 
FM 34-52, Intelligence Interrogation – Used to train CIA interrogators in conducting effective interrogations while conforming with US and international law. Updated in December 2005 to include a 10-page classified section as a result of the Abu Ghraib torture and prisoner abuse scandal. Replaced in September 2006 by FM 2-22.3, Human Intelligence Collector Operations.
FM 3-21.20 – covers the Army Physical Fitness Test (APFT)
FM 27-10 (1956) – Cornerstone of rules of war for the US Military. This manual was last modified in 1976 and is still used by the US military today.
 FM 3–25.150 (Combatives)
 FM 3–22.5 (Drill and Ceremony)
 FM 100-5
 FM 1-100: 
 FM 1-112: 
 FM 1-113: 
 FM 1-116: 
 FM 3-04: 
 FM 3-04.126:

Notes
A.  (   Retrieved 31 August 2013.)
B. 
— 
— 
—

See also
 List of United States Army Field Manuals
 Graphic training aids
 List of numbered documents of the United States Department of War

References

External links

Army Publishing Directorate homepage at army.mil -Free Field Manuals and other publications in .pdf format.
500 Field Manuals online at SurvivaleBooks.com
Incomplete list of active field manuals at army.mil
Field Manuals online at globalsecurity.org
What's an Army field manual? by Slate
The U.S. Army Stability Operations Field Manual The U.S. Army, with forewords by Lieutenant General William B. Caldwell, IV, Michèle Flournoy, and Shawn Brimley and a New Introduction by Janine Davidson. Ann Arbor, University of Michigan Press, 2009.
Military Manuals Collections on CD or download at eMilitary Manuals.com
Army Field Manual, Appendix M, and Torture

 
Field Manuals
Military doctrines